The African Transformation Movement, popularly known as ATM, is a political party in South Africa. It is led by Vuyolwethu Zungula, leader and party president.
It was formed with the backing of the South African Council of Messianic Churches in Christ (SACMCC), which together are supported by millions of congregants.

Policy 
In January 2019, it was announced that the party, if brought to power, would return the death penalty and scrap low pass marks in public schools.

Mzwanele Manyi, chief of policy and strategy for the ATM, further states that the party plans to bring about capital punishment regardless of the constitution not consenting to such matters. Manyi claims that this is due to South Africa being abused as a "haven" for people who commit crimes and need a place to evade the law.

In December 2021, the party said that it opposed mandatory vaccinations against COVID-19.

Election results

The party contested its first elections in 2019, winning two seats nationally, as well as one each in the Eastern Cape and KwaZulu-Natal legislatures.

National Assembly

|-
! Election
! Total votes
! Share of vote
! Seats 
! +/–
! Government
|-
! 2019 
| 76,830
| 0.44%
| 
| –
| 
|}

Provincial elections

! rowspan=2 | Election
! colspan=2 | Eastern Cape
! colspan=2 | Free State
! colspan=2 | Gauteng
! colspan=2 | Kwazulu-Natal
! colspan=2 | Limpopo
! colspan=2 | Mpumalanga
! colspan=2 | North-West
! colspan=2 | Northern Cape
! colspan=2 | Western Cape
|-
! % !! Seats
! % !! Seats
! % !! Seats
! % !! Seats
! % !! Seats
! % !! Seats
! % !! Seats
! % !! Seats
! % !! Seats
|-
! 2019
| 1.52% || 1/63
| 0.78% || 0/30
| 0.25% || 0/73
| 0.49% || 1/80
| 0.28% || 0/49
| 0.61% || 0/30
| 0.39% || 0/33
| 0.24% || 0/30
| 0.24% || 0/42
|}

Municipal elections 

|-
!Election
!Votes
!%
!Seats
|-
!2021
|189,943
|0.62%
|53
|}

References

2018 establishments in South Africa
Capital punishment in South Africa
Christian democratic parties in South Africa
Conservative parties in South Africa
Political parties established in 2018
Political parties in South Africa